In the context of oil wells, pumping is a routine operation involving injecting fluids into the well.  Pumping may either be done by rigging up to the kill wing valve on the Xmas tree or, if an intervention rig up is present pumping into the riser through a T-piece (a small section of riser with a connection on the side).  Pumping is most routinely done to protect the well against scale and hydrates through the pumping of scale inhibitors and methanol.  Pumping of kill weight brine may be done for the purposes of well kills and more exotic chemicals may be pumped from surface for cleaning the lower completion or stimulating the reservoir (though these types are jobs are more frequently done with coiled tubing for extra precision).

Importance of knowing quantity
Work involving wells is fraught with difficulties as there is often very little information about the real time condition of the completion.  This lack of knowledge also covers potential damage and even loss of well integrity.  Therefore, it is essential for the operator to pay attention to the pressures as recorded and to the quantity pumped.  A premature increase in pressure is sign of a potential blockage and continuing to pump risks burst pressure retaining components.  Pumping more than an anticipated amount of fluid is a sign of a loss of integrity and a potential leak path somewhere.  In either of these two situations, pumping must be stopped and the potential causes analysed.

Compressed volumes
It is vital to know the effective capacity of the completion being filled in order to understand what are sensible volumes.  If pumping is to continue until reaching a desired pressurisation, then the compressibility of the fluid will become significant.  It is therefore important to know how much the fluid will compress under pressure to know how much extra fluid is expected to be required.

As a rule of thumb in the oilfield, compression is governed by the equation:

where ΔV is the change in volume, P is the pressure at surface and V is the volume of fluid unpressurised.  k is a compression factor approximately 3.5×10−6 psi−1.

For example, a volume of 300 bbl is to be filled with brine and pressurised to 3000 psi at the surface.  The compression is

Therefore, it is expected that 303.15 bbl are required to accomplish this task.  If 3000 psi is achieved prior to this quantity being pumped, a blockage is to be suspected.  If after pumping 303 bbl, pressurisation is not achieved, a leak is to be suspected.

Oil wells